Comatose Bunny Butcher is the third mini-album by Olivia Lufkin, released on June 27, 2003 under the labels Avex Trax and Tower Records Japan on December 12, 2003.

Track listing
 "Celestial Delinquent"
 "026unconscious333"
 "57StoЯM03"
 "Devil's in Me"
 "Bliss Forest"

References

Olivia Lufkin albums
2003 EPs
Avex Group EPs